Tokat Gaziosmanpaşa University is a public university established in 1992 and primarily located in Tokat, Turkey. The university takes its name from the famous Turkish commander Gazi Osman Nuri Pasha, who was born in Tokat.

Faculties 
Faculty of Agriculture
Faculty of Arts and Sciences
Faculty of Dentistry
Faculty of Economics and Administrative Sciences
Faculty of Education
Faculty of Engineering and Architecture
Faculty of Fine Arts
Faculty of Health Sciences
Faculty of Islamic Sciences
Faculty of Law
Faculty of Medicine
Faculty of Pharmacy
Faculty of Sport Sciences

Graduate institutes 
Institute for Graduate Studies in Pure and Applied Sciences 
Institute of Social Sciences 
Institute of Health Sciences

Vocational colleges of higher education
Vocational College of Physical Education
Vocational School of Health Services
Vocational School of Foreign Languages
Zile Dinçerler Vocational School of Tourism and Hotel Management
Tokat Vocational College
Almus Vocational College
Artova Vocational College
Erbaa Vocational College
Niksar Vocational College
Reşadiye Vocational College
Turhal Vocational College
Zile Vocational College
Koyulhisar Vocational College
Erbaa Vocational School of Health Services
Turhal Vocational School of Health Services

University governance 
The present rector of Tokat Gaziosmanpasha University is Prof. Fatih Yılmaz. University has two vice Rectors. Names of vice Rectors are Prof. Mücahit Eğri and Prof. Rasim Koçyiğit.

Notable alumni
 Sibel Özkan, Turkish weightlifter

Gallery

References

External links 

 
 University Campus Plan
 University Library

Universities and colleges in Turkey
State universities and colleges in Turkey
Tokat
Educational institutions established in 1992
1992 establishments in Turkey